Christoph Siefkes (born 20 February 1991) is a German former professional footballer who played as a midfielder. He is related to Patrick Siefkes, who plays as a goalkeeper for SV Drochtersen/Assel.

Career
Siefkes began his career with Hallescher FC, where he scored prolifically for the youth team, and made one appearance for the first-team, as a substitute for Angelo Hauk in a Regionalliga Nord match against SV Wilhelmshaven in May 2010. Shortly after this, he signed for Bayer Leverkusen, to play for the reserve team. After one season he signed a year-long loan deal with Carl Zeiss Jena, where he played alongside his brother, and made 20 appearances in the 3. Liga. The season ended in relegation for Jena, and Christoph returned to Leverkusen for the 2012–13 season.

References

External links
 

1991 births
Living people
German footballers
Association football midfielders
Hallescher FC players
FC Carl Zeiss Jena players
Bayer 04 Leverkusen II players
1. FC Magdeburg players
3. Liga players